Gerald Quist is an American make-up artist. He won five Primetime Emmy Awards and was nominated for eleven more in the category Outstanding Makeup.

Film credits 
Wyatt Earp (1994)
Mr. Holland's Opus (1995)
Sgt. Bilko (1996)
Last Man Standing (1996)
The Jackal (1997)
The Siege (1998)
Breakfast of Champions (1999)The Whole Nine Yards (2000)Gigli (2003)Live Free or Die Hard (2007)Jonah Hex'' (2010)

References

External links 

Living people
Year of birth missing (living people)
Place of birth missing (living people)
American make-up artists
Primetime Emmy Award winners